is a Japanese professional shogi player ranked 5-dan.

Early life
Fujimori was born in Ōta, Tokyo on May 9, 1987. He learned shogi from his mother Natsuko, who is a retired women's shogi professional, at an early age and eventually was accepted into the Japan Shogi Association's apprentice school at the rank of 6-kyū under the tutelage of shogi professional Yasuaki Tsukada in 1999.

Fujimori was promoted to the rank of apprentice professional 3-dan in 2007, and full professional status and the rank of 4-dan in 2011 after finishing the 49th 3-dan League (April 2011September 2011) in second place with a record of 12 wins and 6 losses.

Shogi professional
Fujimori finished runner-up in the  tournament twice. He lost the 43rd Shinjin-Ō match to Takuya Nagase 2 games to 1 in October 2012, and then 44th Shinjin-Ō match to Ryūma Tonari by the same score in October of the following year.

Promotion history
The promotion history for Fujimori is as follows:

6-kyū: September 1999 
3-dan: October 2007
4-dan: October 1, 2011 
5-dan: March 23, 2017

Personal life
Fujimori's and his mother are the only motherson pair to become professional shogi players. His father is also a strong amateur shogi player.

References

External links
 ShogiHub: Professional Player Info · Fujimori, Tetsuya
 
 YouTube: 将棋放浪記

Japanese shogi players
Living people
Professional shogi players
Professional shogi players from Tokyo
1987 births
People from Ōta, Tokyo
Shogi YouTubers
Japanese YouTubers